Siebenbürgenlied (literally Transylvania song or Transylvania's song) is a regional anthem composed by Johann Lukas Hedwig with lyrics by Maximilian Leopold Moltke originally as a regional anthem for the Transylvanian Saxons. The anthem has been translated into both Hungarian by Ritoók János and Romanian by Dan Dănilă, thus becoming an unofficial anthem for Transylvania as a whole.

Lyrics

References

External links
"Das Siebenbürgerlied - Siebenbürgen, Land des Segens"; Recording of the song
"Das Siebenbürgerlied - Siebenbürgen, Land des Segens"; Sheet music for mixed choir

Transylvanian Saxon people
Regional songs
European anthems
Transylvania
1848 songs